Antonia Hodgson  (born 1971) is a British historical crime writer and publisher.

Life
Hodgson was born in Derby in 1971. She attended Littleover Community School. She graduated with a degree in English Literature from Leeds University in 1994 and she went to work for Harcourt, Brace.

Hodgson spent nearly twenty years in the publishing business rising to editor-in-chief at Little, Brown before she published her own first novel.

Hodgson's first novel, A Devil in the Marshalsea, was set in the time of the early Georgians, William Hogarth and the Southwark prison the Marshalsea. Hodgson believes that the Georgian period was more intriguing than the Victorian era which is usually considered to be more culturally important. The book was submitted anonymously to the publishers, Hodder & Stoughton, because she was known in the publishing industry. Her first book won the Crime Writers Association's Historical Dagger award and was long listed for a first novel award. It also was shortlisted in 2015 for the Theakston's Old Peculier Crime Novel of the Year Award.

Works
The Devil in the Marshalsea
The Last Confession of Thomas Hawkins
A death in Fountains Abbey
The Silver Collar

References

1971 births
Living people
People from Derby
British women novelists
21st-century British novelists
21st-century British women writers